Al-Alamein  is a Syrian village located in the Hama Subdistrict of the Hama District in Hama Governorate.  According to the Syria Central Bureau of Statistics (CBS), al-Alamein had a population of 1,081 in the 2004 census.

References 

Populated places in Hama District
Villages in Syria